Andrew Gunadie (better known as gunnarolla on YouTube; born February 7, 1986) is a Canadian internet personality, musician, and video producer. He is best known for "Canadian, Please", a music video in which he co-starred and co-produced with Julia Bentley. Collectively, his YouTube videos have surpassed 10 million views. In 2013, he won the Digi Award for Online Personality of the Year.

Early life and career
Gunadie was born on February 7 and raised in London, Ontario. He obtained a BA (Honours) in Media, Information & Technoculture at Western University, and a diploma in Television Broadcasting at Fanshawe College.

Gunadie has worked in post-production on several Canadian television productions, and he was also the Senior Coordinator, Multimedia Content for TIFF.

"Canadian, Please" and issues of racism
Gunadie gained popularity on YouTube with the release of "Canadian, Please", a song and music video that he co-produced with Julia Bentley, and released just before Canada Day in 2009.

In the video, the pair sing about all the reasons why one would want to be Canadian, while wearing traditional RCMP jackets. The video went viral soon after its release, and has surpassed 5 million views. On December 20, 2009, Gunadie and Bentley performed the song live at the Olympic Torch Relay in Niagara Falls, Ontario.

Gunadie received many racist comments and threats, due to the fact that he is of visibly Asian descent. Many viewers felt that he was not an adequate representative of Canada, despite the fact that he was born, raised, and continues to live therein.

As a response to the criticism, Gunadie produced a video entitled "He'll Never Be a Real Canadian". Issues of race and stereotypes have since become a theme in Gunadie's work. His experience with racism was featured on a segment of "Online Uncovered" on CBC's Connect with Mark Kelley.

"Canadian, Please" was later featured in the YouTube video "Canadian Dances Moves" which also went viral.

Team Andrew
Early in 2010, Gunadie teamed up with fellow musician and Internet personality Andrew Huang to produce videos and music, and series such as We Are What You Tweet and New State Plates. The pair have toured North America, Australia, and New Zealand together, and are commonly referred to as "Team Andrew".

"The Comic Sans Song"
While on tour in Australia, Gunadie began production on the music video for "The Comic Sans Song"  which is part of Gunadie's #22songs series and features a rap by Huang. The majority of the video is set in Hosier Lane in Melbourne, Australia, and features Gunadie and a group of Australian fans.

The music video was released on May 22, 2012 and gained popularity thanks in part to being featured on BuzzFeed, Clients from Hell, MTV Buzzworthy Blog, Mashable, and even Ban Comic Sans.

Dreamz
Early in 2013, Gunadie and Huang teamed up again to form an electro-pop music duo called Dreamz. They entered CBC Music's Searchlight contest under this new name. Their debut single "Come On" was selected as CBC Here and Now's Song of the Week on March 11, 2013, and was played on CBC Radio One all that week.

They made it as far as the Top 16 of CBC Music's Searchlight contest, representing Toronto.

Like/Comment/Subscribe live show
Outside of YouTube, Gunadie has teamed up with fellow YouTube personality Andrew Bravener to produce and host Like/Comment/Subscribe; a live, interactive show that features screenings and performances. According to Gunadie, the goal of the show "wasn’t to make the big videos bigger. We went into the community to find those hidden gems: rants, confessions, re-cuts, mashups, lip-syncs & even that ‘weird’ part of YouTube."

They premiered the show on Saturday, September 29, 2012 from 7pm to 7am at TIFF Bell Lightbox during Scotiabank Nuit Blanche 2012. Their hashtag #YTTO trended on Twitter that night. They later presented the show at PHI Centre on Saturday, March 2, 2013 for Montréal en lumière 2013 and presented a special edition of the show at the 2013 North by Northeast festival in Toronto.

Gunadie and Bravener also hosted the 2012 Digi Awards alongside French-Canadian host and producer Anne-Marie Withenshaw, and YouTube personality Harley Morenstein (of Epic Meal Time).

Along with Andrew Bravener, he presented "Cringeworthy!", a variation of the "Like/Comment/Subscribe" show, at Scotiabank Nuit Blanche 2014.

Late 2013-present
Gunadie hosted various screenings and made appearances at Buffer Festival in Toronto.

He also served as YouTube correspondent for CBC's Searchlight competition, wherein he hosted a series called "Searchlight Spotlight".

In March 2014, his EP titled "S*X"  peaked at #1 on the comedy chart of iTunes Canada.

Discography

References

External links
gunnarolla's YouTube channel

Canadian pop musicians
University of Western Ontario alumni
Canadian YouTubers
Music YouTubers
1986 births
Comedy YouTubers
Living people